The following is a list of the governors of West Sumatra who have served since October 1, 1945 until now.

The governor of West Sumatra, one of the provinces of Indonesia, is the chief executive of the province. The office was created in 1958, thirteen years after Indonesian independence in 1945.

List of governors 
 West Sumatra Residency (1945–1948) 

 Central Sumatra Province (1948–1956) 

 West Sumatra Province (1958–present)

References
Footnotes

 Reference

Bibliography

 
 
 
 
 

West Sumatra